Phenacocoelus is an extinct genus of oreodont of the family Merycoidodontidae,  endemic to North America. Fossils have been uncovered in eastern Wyoming and western Nebraska.

References

Oreodonts
Prehistoric mammals of North America
Oligocene even-toed ungulates
Miocene even-toed ungulates
Aquitanian genus extinctions
Chattian genus first appearances
Prehistoric even-toed ungulate genera